The Hebrew Union College – Jewish Institute of Religion (also known as HUC, HUC-JIR, and The College-Institute) is a Jewish seminary with three locations in the United States and one location in Jerusalem.  It is the oldest extant Jewish seminary in the Americas and the main seminary for training rabbis, cantors, educators and communal workers in Reform Judaism. HUC-JIR has campuses in Cincinnati, Ohio, New York City, Los Angeles, California and Jerusalem. The Jerusalem campus is the only seminary in Israel for training Reform Jewish clergy.

History

HUC was founded in Cincinnati in 1875 under the leadership of Rabbi Isaac Mayer Wise. Jacob Ezekiel was Secretary of the Board, registrar, and treasurer from the College's inception until just before his death in 1899. The first rabbinical class graduated in 1883. The graduation banquet for this class became known as the Trefa Banquet because it included food that was not kosher, such as clams, soft-shell crabs, shrimp, frogs' legs and dairy products served immediately after meat. At the time, Reform rabbis were split over the question of whether the Jewish dietary restrictions were still applicable. Some of the more traditionalist Reform rabbis thought the banquet menu went too far, and were compelled to find an alternative between Reform Judaism and Orthodox Judaism. This was a major cause of the founding of American Conservative Judaism.

In 1950, a second HUC campus was created in New York through a merger with the rival Reform Jewish Institute of Religion. Additional campuses were added in Los Angeles in 1954, and in Jerusalem in 1963.

As of 2009, the Hebrew Union College – Jewish Institute of Religion is an international seminary and university of graduate studies offering a wide variety of academic and professional programs. In addition to its Rabbinical School, the College-Institute includes Schools of Graduate Studies, Education, Jewish Non-Profit Management, sacred music, Biblical archaeology and an Israeli rabbinical program.

The Los Angeles campus operates many of its programs and degrees in cooperation with the neighboring University of Southern California, a partnership that has lasted over 35 years. Their productive relationship includes the creation of the Center for Muslim-Jewish Engagement, an interfaith think tank through the partnership of HUC, USC and Omar Foundation. CMJE holds religious text-study programs across Los Angeles. Ironically, no classrooms on this campus have windows.

Rabbi Alfred Gottschalk was appointed as HUC's sixth president, following the death of Nelson Glueck. As president, Gottschalk oversaw the growth and expansion of the HUC campuses, the ordination of Sally Priesand as the first female rabbi in the United States, the investiture of Reform Judaism's first female hazzan and the ordination of Naamah Kelman as the first female rabbi to be ordained in Israel.

In 1996, Rabbi Sheldon Zimmerman was appointed as the 7th President of the College-Institute. He was succeeded in 2000 by Rabbi David Ellenson as the 8th President. The 9th president of HUC-JIR, elected in 2014, was Rabbi Aaron D. Panken, Ph.D. A noted authority on rabbinic and Second Temple literature, with research interests in the historical development of legal concepts and terms, Rabbi Panken was killed in a plane crash on May 5, 2018, while piloting a single-engine Aeronca 7AC over New York's Hudson Valley.

Andrew Rehfeld was elected the 10th president on December 18, 2018, and inaugurated at Plum Street Temple in Cincinnati on October 27, 2019.

On April 11, 2022, the Board of Governors at HUC voted to shutter the residential rabbinical program in Cincinnati by 2026 due to financial troubles and falling enrollment.

The Debbie Friedman School of Sacred Music
The cantorial school of the Hebrew Union College – Jewish Institute of Religion was founded in 1947. The school is located on the New York campus of HUC-JIR at One West Fourth Street. It offers a five-year graduate program, conferring the degree of Master of Sacred Music in the fourth year and ordination as cantor in the fifth year.

Cantorial School at HUC-JIR begins in Jerusalem and continues for the next four years in New York. While in Israel, students study Hebrew, and Jewish music, and get to know Israel. Cantorial students study alongside Rabbinical and Education students. In New York, the program includes professional learning opportunities as a student-cantor, in which students serve congregations within and outside of the NY area.

The curriculum includes liturgical music classes covering traditional Shabbat, High Holiday and Festival nusach, Chorus, Musicology, Reform Liturgy and Composition; Judaica and text classes such as Bible, Midrash and History; and professional development. Each student is assigned practica (mini-recitals) during the 2nd, 3rd, and 4th year of school culminating with a Senior Recital (based on a thesis) during the 5th year.

Rabbi David Ellenson, then president of Hebrew Union College – Jewish Institute of Religion, announced on January 27, 2011, that the School of Sacred Music would be renamed the Debbie Friedman School of Sacred Music in honor of Debbie Friedman. The renaming officially occurred on December 7, 2011.

Gender equality

HUC has both male and female students in all its programs, including rabbinic and cantorial studies. As of January 2022, it has 839 women rabbinical graduates. (See Women and the rabbinical credential). The first female rabbi to be ordained by HUC was Sally Priesand, ordained in 1972, the only woman in a class with 35 men. The first female cantor to be invested by HUC was Barbara Ostfeld in 1975.

After four years of deliberation, HUC decided to give women a choice of wording on their ordination certificates beginning in 2016, including the option to have the same wording as men. Up until then, male candidates' certificates identified them by the Reform movement's traditional "morenu harav," or "our teacher the rabbi," while female candidates' certificates only used the term "rav u’morah," or "rabbi and teacher." Sally Priesand herself was unaware that her certificate referred to her any differently than her male colleagues until it was brought to her attention years later. Rabbi Mary Zamore, executive director of the Reform movement's Women's Rabbinic Network, explained that the HUC was uncomfortable with giving women the same title as men. In 2012 she wrote to Rabbi David Ellenson, HUC's then president, requesting that he address the discrepancy, which she said was "smacking of gender inequality."

In 2021, following new reports about sexual abuse by former HUC president Sheldon Zimmerman and recently-deceased professor Michael Cook, three separate Reform organizations began internal investigations of sexual harassment and other forms of discrimination. HUC retained the law firm Morgan Lewis, who conducted 170 interviews addressing incidents beginning in the 1970s. The report described the culture at the school's campuses as a "good old boys" mindset demonstrating favoritism towards cisgender men, particularly at the Cincinnati and Jerusalem campuses. It found that students and administration were reluctant to confront professors over repeated incidents of harassment and discrimination, as many of the perpetrators are or were revered scholars in their field, and complaints were often swept under the rug. Former professors Steven M. Cohen, Michael Cook, and Stephen Passamaneck, Director of Litiurgical Arts and Music Bonia Shur, and former presidents Alfred Gottschalk and Sheldon Zimmerman were reported to be the subject of repeated credible allegations of sexual harassment. The report recommended renaming or removing endowed chairs, scholarships, statues, and buildings that honor the wrongdoers. The school's current president and board both stated that they would make teshuvah (repent), work to prevent such incidents, and revise policies for handling misconduct complaints.

Resources
The HUC library system contains one of the most extensive Jewish collections in the world. Each campus has its own library:
 Klau Library in Cincinnati, the main research library. This library is the second-largest collection of printed Jewish material in the world (the National Library of Israel in Jerusalem is the first). The library states it has 700,000 volumes, including 150 incunabula and over 2,000 manuscript codices.
 Klau Library in New York—130,000 volumes.
 S. Zalman and Ayala Abramov Library in Jerusalem—100,000 volumes.
 Frances-Henry Library in Los Angeles—100,000 volumes.

The three U.S. campuses share a catalog, but the Jerusalem collection is separately cataloged.

Publications
Hebrew Union College operates Hebrew Union College Press, a university press, through which it releases Jewish Studies-related publications.

Museum
The Dr. Bernard Heller Museum at Hebrew Union College – Jewish Institute of Religion in New York presents exhibitions highlighting Jewish history, culture, and contemporary creativity.

Since its founding in 1983 as the Joseph Gallery, the HUC-JIR Museum has grown physically to encompass  of exhibition space, expanding to include the Petrie Great Hall, Klingenstein Gallery, Heller Gallery and Backman Gallery.

The Hebrew Union College – Jewish Institute of Religion also manages the Skirball Cultural Center in Los Angeles and Skirball Museum in Jerusalem.

Notable faculty
Notable faculty members have included Judah Magnes, who was also the founding chancellor and president of Hebrew University of Jerusalem, Rabbi Abraham Cronbach, Rabbi Tamara Cohn Eskenazi, Abraham Joshua Heschel, Leo Baeck, Nelson Glueck, Moses Buttenweiser, Eugene Borowitz, Jacob Z. Lauterbach, Lawrence A. Hoffman, Louis Grossmann, Moses Mielziner, Julian Morgenstern, Rabbi Alvin J. Reines, Debbie Friedman, Rachel Adler and Carole B. Balin, as well as Sami Rohr Choicie Award for Jewish Literature and National Jewish Book Award recipient Sarah Bunin Benor.

Notable alumni

Israel Aaron, rabbi and published scholar, (1859 – 1912)

 Carole B. Balin, M.A. Hebrew letters, 1989; rabbinic ordination, 1991
 Henry Berkowitz, rabbi, D.D., 1887
 Joshua Bloch, rabbi and librarian
 Reeve Robert Brenner, rabbi, inventor, and author
 Barnett R. Brickner, rabbi
 Angela Warnick Buchdahl (born 1972), first Asian-American to be ordained as a rabbi, and first Asian-American to be ordained as a hazzan (cantor) in the world
 Abraham Cronbach, rabbi and teacher
 Maurice Davis, rabbi and activist
 Abraham J. Feldman (1893–1977), rabbi
 Samuel H. Goldenson, rabbi
 Moses J. Gries, rabbi
 Louis Grossmann, rabbi and HUC professor
 Hugo Gryn, British rabbi and BBC radio broadcaster
 James G. Heller, rabbi and composer
 Maximilian Heller, rabbi
 Ammiel Hirsch, rabbi, lawyer, and former executive director of the Association of Reform Zionists of America/World Union for Progressive Judaism, North America
 Richard Jacobs (rabbi), rabbi, president of the Union for Reform Judaism
 Gilad Kariv, first Reform rabbi to be elected to the Israeli Knesset, Executive Director of the Israel Movement for Reform and Progressive Judaism
 Joseph Krauskopf, founder of the National Farm School (now Delaware Valley University).
 Elliot Kukla, came out as transgender six months before his ordination in 2006, and was the first openly transgender person to be ordained by HUC-JIR
 Ruth Langer, Professor of Theology at Boston College
 Emil W. Leipziger, rabbi
 Helen Levinthal, first American woman to complete the entire course of study in a rabbinical school
 Felix A. Levy, rabbi
 Jack P. Lewis, professor in Harding School of Theology (Enrollment in Hebrew Union College is open to non-Jews.)
 Judah Leon Magnes, rabbi, Chancellor/President of the Hebrew University of Jerusalem, 1925–1948
 Jennie Mannheimer, speech and drama teacher, elocutionist
 Jacqueline Mates-Muchin, first Chinese-American rabbi in the world
 Martin A. Meyer, rabbi
 Julian Morgenstern, rabbi, HUC professor, and HUC president
 Morris Newfield, rabbi
 Sally Priesand, America's first female rabbi ordained by a rabbinical seminary, and the second formally ordained female rabbi in Jewish history, after Regina Jonas 
 Aaron D. Panken, 12th president of HUC-JIR, 2014–2018 
 Michael Robinson, rabbi and civil rights activist
 Jonathan Rosenbaum, scholar
 A. James Rudin, rabbi
 Norbert M. Samuelson, professor of Jewish philosophy at Arizona State University
 Julie Schwartz, who was ordained by HUC-JIR and later founded HUC-JIR's course of study in pastoral counseling for rabbinical students
 Seymour Schwartzman, opera singer and cantor
 Abram Simon, rabbi
 Alysa Stanton, world's first black female rabbi
 Lance J. Sussman, scholar
 Joseph Stolz, rabbi
 Amy Weiss, American Reform rabbi, and non-profit founder
 Louis Wolsey, rabbi
 Eric Yoffie, rabbi, president of the Union for Reform Judaism
 Rabbi Dr. Walter Zanger, tour guide and television personality 
 Isaiah Zeldin (1920-2018) rabbi
 Reuben Zellman, first openly transgender person accepted to HUC-JIR in 2003; he was ordained by HUC-JIR in 2010
 George Zepin (1878–1963), rabbi
 Martin Zielonka, rabbi

See also
 List of Jewish universities and colleges in the United States
 Reform Judaism

References

External links
 

Educational institutions established in 1875
Greater Cincinnati Consortium of Colleges and Universities
 
Jewish seminaries
Jewish universities and colleges in the United States
Jews and Judaism in Cincinnati
Reform Judaism
Schools accredited by the Western Association of Schools and Colleges
Seminaries and theological colleges in California
Seminaries and theological colleges in New York City
Seminaries and theological colleges in Ohio
Universities and colleges in Cincinnati
Reform Judaism in Ohio
1875 establishments in Ohio